Twenty Grand (1928–1948) was an American thoroughbred race horse. Owned and bred by Helen Hay Whitney's Greentree Stable, Twenty Grand was a bay colt by St. Germans out of Bonus.

Racing career

Trained at age three by James G. Rowe, Jr. and ridden by jockey Charley Kurtsinger, Twenty Grand raced against very strong opponents in 1930 and 1931 when he was part of what the Chicago Tribune newspaper called the "big four"  in racing, which included Jamestown, Mate, and Equipoise. Twenty Grand won the Wood Memorial Stakes, Kentucky Derby, Belmont Stakes, Dwyer Stakes, Travers Stakes, Saratoga Cup, and the Jockey Club Gold Cup. 
In his only blemish of the year, Twenty Grand just missed the Triple Crown, finishing second to Mate in the Preakness. He went off as the post time favorite at 3:2. Mate, his stablemate, was sent to the front early, followed by Clock Tower. As Twenty Grand tried to pass the leaders on the clubhouse turn, he was bumped badly by Clock Tower. Twenty Grand was knocked off his stride but recovered. Down the back stretch and around the final turn, he made up ground on Ladder and Mate. His jockey, Charlie Kurtsinger, chose the rail and went inside, but the tiring Mate blocked Twenty Grand and held on to win by a half length. Twenty Grand's performances in 1931 earned him retrospective American Horse of the Year honors.

After twenty five races, of which he won fourteen, finished second four times and third three times, Twenty Grand was retired to stud but proved to be sterile.

In 1957, he was elected to the National Museum of Racing and Hall of Fame. In the Blood-Horse ranking of the top 100 U.S. thoroughbred champions of the 20th Century, Twenty Grand ranked number 52.

Twenty Grand Cigarette Brand
Twenty Grand's fame was reflected in his name and image being used for a brand of cigarettes put out by Axton-Fisher Tobacco Co. In 1936, Axton-Fisher's  right to the Twenty Grand trademark was upheld after it was sued for trademark infringement.

Cigarette Camp
Camp Twenty Grand was an American Army "cigarette camp", located near Le Havre, France, during World War II and named after the once-popular American cigarette brand (Twenty Grand cigarettes).

See also
 List of historical horses

References

External links
 Twenty Grand's pedigree
 Twenty Grand's Kentucky Derby
 Twenty Grand at the United states' National Museum of Racing and Hall of Fame
 Article about Twenty Grand at Colin's Ghost

1928 racehorse births
1948 racehorse deaths
Whitney racehorses
Racehorses trained in the United States
Racehorses bred in Kentucky
Kentucky Derby winners
American Thoroughbred Horse of the Year
United States Thoroughbred Racing Hall of Fame inductees
Belmont Stakes winners
Thoroughbred family 5-g